The 14th Government of Slovenia was formed following the resignation of Prime Minister of the 13th Government Marjan Šarec in January 2020. Janez Janša of Slovenian Democratic Party formed a coalition with Modern Centre Party, New Slovenia, and Democratic Party of Pensioners of Slovenia. The government was confirmed on 13 March 2020, amidst the COVID-19 pandemic.

Government formation 
On 27 January 2020 Prime Minister Marjan Šarec (LMŠ) resigned following the resignation of the Finance Minister Andrej Bertoncelj (LMŠ) and previously announced resignation of Minister of Health Aleš Šabeder (LMŠ) due to disagreements around new healthcare legislation.

On 25 February 2020 President Pahor concluded the second round of consultations with political parties. Parties that are forming the new government confirmed the coalition agreement which was signed on the same day.

On 26 February 2020 President of the Republic Borut Pahor proposed to the National Assembly Janez Janša as candidate for Prime Minister.

On 3 March 2020 Janez Janša was elected Prime Minister with 52 votes, which means 3 opposition MPs voted for him, most probably MPs of SNS. Jani Ivanuša (SNS) also publicly stated he would support Janša.

On 6 March 2020 Prime Minister-elect Janez Janša proposed to the National Assembly the list of candidates for ministers. Hearings took place from 10 until 13 March 2020. Ministers of the 13th Government worked closely with the incoming formation in the time of transition to inform incoming ministers on the situation related to the coronavirus outbreak. Such coordination has not happened before. Both formations had a joint meeting on 9 March 2020. On 12 March 2020 outgoing Minister of Health Aleš Šabeder declared epidemic. Prime Minister-elect was critical of some decision taken by the outgoing formation.

On 13 March 2020 the National Assembly confirmed the list of ministers and the government took office.

Election of the Prime Minister 
The Prime Minister is elected by the National Assembly with majority of all votes. Candidate is proposed by the President of the Republic (1st, 2nd and 3rd round) or by MPs (2nd and 3rd round only). If a Prime Minister is not elected in the first two rounds, the National Assembly can decide with relative majority of votes, to hold the third round, where only relative majority is needed to elect Prime Minister.

Government confirmation vote 
After being elected Prime Minister-elect proposes his government to the National Assembly. Government is elected with relative majority. Only after the government is elected and sworn-in, Prime Minister and ministers take their offices. Swearing-in ceremony takes place immediately after the vote.

Cabinet

Cabinet level positions are those of Prime Minister, ministers and ministers without portfolio. Others are present at the cabinet meetings (e.g. Chief of Staff to the Prime Minister, Secretary-General of the Government, Head of the Government Legal Service, state secretaries in the Office of the Prime Minister etc.). State secretaries can substitute ministers when absent. If Prime Minister is absent, he is substituted by one of the ministers, usually one of those holding the unofficial title of Deputy Prime Minister. Cabinet usually takes decisions by consensus, but it can also decide with relative majority of votes.

Government coalition

Composition lato sensu

Working bodies

Other bodies

Coronavirus SARS-CoV-2 outbreak
On its 1st Session on 13 March 2020, immediately following its confirmation, government set up a Crisis Management Staff (CMS) of the Republic of Slovenia in order to contain and manage the COVID-19 epidemic. Head of the Staff is Prime Minister Janez Janša and its secretary is former SOVA director Andrej Rupnik. CMS is composed of all government members and other experts and civil servants. CMS has Health Experts Support Group. Head of the Group is Bojana Beovič. Jelko Kacin, former minister and ambassador to NATO, is the official spokesman of the Staff, he had a similar role during the 1991 Slovenian war of independence.

Crisis Management Staff was abolished on 24 March 2020, its functions were transferred on the responsible ministries.

Crisis Management Staff

Confirmation process and former members

Biographies

Former members

Cabinet composition timeline

Timeline of Government

Coronavirus pandemic 
The new government took office in the midst of the COVID-19 pandemic. The period during and immediately after the transition of power was marked by a series of controversial actions and decisions by the incoming government. The government allocated the highest possible salaries allowed by law to its ministers and state secretaries before reducing government functionaries' wages by 30% for the duration of the epidemic.

A state crisis office was created to confront the epidemic. The official Twitter account of the crisis office that was meant to inform the public about the epidemic frequently retweeted articles from SDS's official party newspaper and published an offensive and slanderous statement about four prominent critics of the government (saying that they escaped from a mental hospital and were infected with "virus COVID-Marx/Lenin") that prompted a lawsuit against the institution by the subjects of the tweet. The official explanation for the inappropriate communications – unauthorised access to the account by an unknown individual – was later refuted by the police.

Medical supplies procurement controversies 
The government temporarily suspended public financial disclosures during the epidemic by ceasing to provide the relevant information to the Anti-Corruption Commission which is responsible for publication, thus making the state procurement process opaque to the public. The incident, dubbed "the Mask Affair" by the media, led to conflicting statements from two government ministers about whether the order was pre-paid and whether the masks were en route or actually never existed, and reports of sketchy businesses involved in the public procurement process that were anticipating exorbitant profit margins from the deal.

In a series or revelations, various government and allied politicians were found to have exerted pressure on the organisation tasked with crisis procurement, or influenced/attempted to influence the procurement process in favour of particular suppliers (that were sometimes offering less appropriate or more expensive products, or would be delivering them on a protracted timetable). The revelations prompted in a criminal investigation. After the parliamentary opposition announced its intention to launch a parliamentary investigative commission to look into the potential improprieties, the government responded by launching its own investigative commission which would additionally to the opposition proposal focus its attention on the failings of the preceding Šarec government's handling of the early pandemic response.

On 30 June, investigators from the National Bureau of Investigations carried out multiple searches in connection with the supplies procurement, including of the premises of the Ministry of Economic Development and Technology. The Minister of Economic Development and Technology was briefly detained while the Minister of Interior and general director of police both announced their resignation due to the investigation.

Criticism of the press 
The government decided to carry out press briefings without physical presence of journalists during the coronavirus, a practice similar to those of Austria, European Commission and other.

Janša published a lengthy essay entitled "War with the Media" on his official Facebook account where he expounded on his view on the media. The text was also published on the official government website, and shared on the official Facebook account of the Slovenian government as a paid advertisement. The government's social media accounts were also being used to share other political statements by the PM and to publicise his weekly call-in talk show on the SDS-linked Nova24TV TV channel. In the text Janša discissed the freedom of media and the balace of left-leaning and right-leaning media in Slovenia.

Conflict with institutions 
Upon taking office, the government swiftly replaced the leadership of the police, army, and intelligence services, which was also practice of the majority of the previous governments. The dismissed general secretary of police had just recently been admonished by an SDS politician to "consider her future" after she refused to make available information during a parliamentary oversight meeting due to a lack of legal authority for her to do so. Among the information being solicited were reportedly details regarding a criminal investigation into foreign financing of SDS-affiliated media organisations. The new government politicised the National Institute of Public Health (NIJZ), swapping two acting heads of the organisation in rapid succession after they fell out of favour (the second after saying the government's measures lacked scientific basis). PM Janša disparaged the WHO and called for the resignation of the director general while labelling Slovene public health experts who expressed objections to government public health policies as "so-called experts" and said the government is relying on "common peasant wisdom".

The Ministry of Foreign Affairs sent a communique to the Council of Europe in which it alleged that communist legacy media constitute a majority of the Slovene media space, while the Interior Minister said he "[...] informed EU interior ministers about the media's and political left's fight against the government that is successfully stemming the epidemic. [...]" and listing anti-government protests as an example of such a fight.

The head of the National Bureau of Investigations (NPU) that was conducting the criminal investigation regarding potential improprieties with the procurement process was also summarily dismissed shortly after the investigation was launched. NPU and UPPD were additionally also carrying out a criminal investigation into foreign financing of SDS-affiliated media.

The government also dismissed the head of the national Statistical Office, reportedly because he did not allow an informal government working group (that was tasked with crafting the economic response to the pandemic outfall) to access confidential and highly sensitive raw econometric data collected by the Office. The pre-term dismissal was unprecedented in the nation's history. The board of the Office requested a constitutional evaluation of the dismissal. The dismissal prompted the EU Commissioner for Economy to address a letter to the Slovene government demanding a justification of the dismissal to insure the impartiality and independence of EU national statistical offices. Janša initially justified the dismissal by citing an alleged lack of "responsiveness" to government requests, however, responding to news reports of the letter, Janša responded on Twitter with "[...] I didn’t receive your letter, but press did. @govSlovenia replaced a political appointee as Statistics Office head with an expert with 30 y of experience in this Office. Hope this is the last time you play a political game for Slovenian left. @vonderleyen".

Anti-government protests 

Public dissatisfaction with the government led to a series of protests starting soon after the new government took office, with one protest having taken place even as the negotiations about an SDS coalition government were still taking place. At that protest protester Ludvik Tomšič yelled "Ubi Janšo" (lit. Kill Janša), which was not reported by the dominant media and the police did not take any action. The protests were additionally fueled by the revelations regarding improprieties in the epidemic procurement process. Amnesty International Slovenia found that state actions were endangering the right to protest in Slovenia.

According to polls conducted in May, 52.2% of those polled thought the protests were justified (44.1% did not), and 57% of those interviewed (in another poll) agreed with the demands of the protesters (while 27% did not).

PM Janša labelled the protesters as the "extreme left" in an English-language tweet and claimed that the slogan death to janšism, freedom to the people (a play on words on a popular anti-Axis resistance slogan) that was being used by some protesters constituted a death threat to him and all his voters. The police launched – on recommendation from the PM – at least eight criminal proceedings against protesters for using the slogan on suspicion of making death threats. Janša also claimed that protesters and politicians who support them "are endangering health and lives and spreading #COVID19". SDS used the image of a confrontation between a group of Antifa members and police during one of the protests (that involved Antifa pushing and shoving a safety fence in front of the parliament with police pushing back on the other side) for a cover banner for their social media accounts and a billboard political ad campaign. The Image of the anarchists was tainted red and accompanied with the words "THEY THREATEN, DESTROY..." and contrasted with a photograph of a SDS-supported rally which was accompanied with the words "WE BUILD JOIN SDS".

During a protest Statehood Day "anti-celebration", some 30 pro-government anti-protesters with yellow safety vests appeared on the square where the event was being held and began shouting provocative slogans in an attempt to disrupt the event. Police cordoned the anti-protesters off from the rest of the crowd. Multiple Yellow Wests (as they dubbed themselves) wore clothing and/or footwear and/or had tattoos associated with neo-Nazism, and one was briefly seen making a Nazi salute in a recording of the event. 8 of the protesters were later identified and shown to have affinities for neo-Nazism, with some of them having links to or being high-ranking members of the Slovene Blood & Honour neo-Nazi group. The leader of the Yellow Wests later called on the public to join them in peaceful pro-government anti-protests at the same time and location as the anti-government protests in an "exclusive" interview with the SDS-linked Nova24TV, which also published another article about the Yellow Jackets' call to join their anti-protest (which they termed the "counter-revolution"). Both articles were shared by PM Janša on Twitter. Despite describing themselves as non-violent, the Yellow Jacket shared a meme in which they are described as "unafraid of a physical confrontation". In the Nova24TV interview, the leader of the Jackets – speaking about the risk of a violent confrontation between the group – also stated: "If they wished to attack us, we don't know why they gathered up the courage only after we were separated by police. And despite the police cordon, the anarchists and Antifa chose to stay at a distance greater than a human hand's reach. In fact, they disappointed us, since all those provoking us were retirees."

During the official ceremony celebrating the Statehood Day Slovenian anti-government protester Zlatan Čordić interrupted the ceremony with megaphone and yelled at the President Borut Pahor and others present. Police later explained that due to possible interruptions it had to close the ceremony area because of protection of foreign guests, especially diplomatic corps. Beore the ceremony anti-government protesters, among which was director Dejan Babosek, verbally attacked the Honorary Guard of the Slovenian Armed Forces.

See also 

 10th Government of Slovenia (Janša II Cabinet)
 8th Government of Slovenia (Janša I Cabinet)

References 

Cabinets of Slovenia
Cabinets established in 2020
Politics of Slovenia
2020 establishments in Slovenia
2022 disestablishments in Slovenia